{{Infobox film
| name           = La Grande Illusion
| image          = GrandeIllusion.jpg
| alt            = 
| caption        = French film poster
| director       = Jean Renoir
| producer       =
| writer         = 
| starring       = 
| music          = Joseph Kosma
| cinematography = Christian Matras
| editing        = 
| studio         = Réalisations d'Art Cinématographique (RAC)
| distributor    = {{Plainlist|
 World Pictures (original U.S. release)
 Janus Films ("later re-release")
}}
| released       = 
| runtime        = 114 minutes
| country        = France
| language       = 
| budget         = 
| gross          = $414,620 (US re-release)
}}La Grande Illusion (also known as The Grand Illusion) is a 1937 French war film directed by Jean Renoir, who co-wrote the screenplay with Charles Spaak. The story concerns class relationships among a small group of French officers who are prisoners of war during World War I and are plotting an escape. The title of the film comes from the 1909 book The Great Illusion by British journalist Norman Angell, which argued that war is futile because of the common economic interests of all European nations. The perspective of the film is generously humanistic to its characters of various nationalities.La Grande Illusion is regarded by critics and film historians as one of the masterpieces of French cinema and among the greatest films ever made. Orson Welles named La Grande Illusion as one of the two movies he would take with him "on the ark." In 1958, the film was voted number 5 on the prestigious Brussels 12 list at the 1958 World Expo. In 1995, the Vatican included La Grande Illusion in its list of 45 "great films" under the category of "Art." Empire magazine ranked it #35 in "The 100 Best Films Of World Cinema" in 2010.

Plot

During the First World War, two French aviators, the aristocratic Captain de Boëldieu and the working-class Lieutenant Maréchal, set out to investigate a blurred spot found on reconnaissance photographs. They are shot down by German flying ace and aristocrat, Rittmeister von Rauffenstein, and both are taken prisoner by the Imperial German Army. Upon returning to the aerodrome, von Rauffenstein sends a subordinate to find out if the aviators are officers and, if so, to invite them to lunch. During the meal, Rauffenstein and Boëldieu discover they have mutual acquaintances—a depiction of the familiarity, if not solidarity, within the upper classes that crosses national boundaries.

Boëldieu and Maréchal are then taken to a prisoner-of-war camp, where they meet a colorful group of French prisoners and stage a vaudeville-type performance just after the Germans have taken Fort Douaumont in the epic Battle of Verdun. During the performance, word arrives that the French have recaptured the fort. Maréchal interrupts the show, and the French prisoners spontaneously burst into "La Marseillaise". As a result of the disruption, Maréchal is placed in solitary confinement, where he suffers badly from lack of human contact and hunger; the fort changes hands once more while he is imprisoned.  Boëldieu and Maréchal also help their fellow prisoners to finish digging an escape tunnel. However, just before it is completed, everyone is transferred to other camps. Because of the language barrier, Maréchal is unable to pass word of the tunnel to an incoming British prisoner.

Boëldieu and Maréchal are moved from camp to camp, finally arriving in Wintersborn, a mountain fortress prison commanded by Rauffenstein, who has been so badly injured in battle that he has been given a posting away from the front, much to his regret. Rauffenstein tells them that Wintersborn is escape-proof.

At Wintersborn, the pair are reunited with a fellow prisoner, Rosenthal, from the original camp. Rosenthal is a wealthy French Jew, a naturalized French citizen who generously shares the food parcels he receives.  Boëldieu comes up with an idea, after carefully observing how the German guards respond to an emergency. He volunteers to distract the guards for the few minutes needed for Maréchal and Rosenthal to escape. After a commotion staged by the prisoners, the guards are ordered to assemble them in the fortress courtyard. During the roll call, it is discovered that Boëldieu is missing. He makes his presence known high up in the fortress, drawing the German guards away in pursuit. Maréchal and Rosenthal take the opportunity to lower themselves from a window by a homemade rope and flee.

Rauffenstein stops the guards from firing at Boëldieu and pleads with his friend to give himself up.  Boëldieu refuses, and Rauffenstein reluctantly shoots him with his pistol, aiming for his legs but fatally hitting him in the stomach. Nursed in his final moments by a grieving Rauffenstein, Boëldieu laments that the whole purpose of the nobility and their usefulness to both French and German culture is being destroyed by the war. He expresses pity for von Rauffenstein, who will have to find a new purpose in the postwar world.

Maréchal and Rosenthal journey across the German countryside, trying to reach neutral Switzerland. Rosenthal injures his foot, slowing Maréchal down. They quarrel and part, but then Maréchal returns to help his comrade. They take refuge in the modest farmhouse of a German woman, Elsa, who lost her husband at Verdun, along with three brothers, at battles which, with quiet irony, she describes as "our greatest victories." She takes them in and does not betray them to a passing army patrol. She and Maréchal fall in love, despite not speaking each other's language, but he and Rosenthal eventually leave from a sense of duty after Rosenthal recovers from his injury. Maréchal declares he will come back to Elsa and her young daughter, Lotte, if he survives the war.

A German patrol sights the two fugitives crossing a snow-covered valley. They fire a few rounds, but then their commanding officer orders them to stop, saying the pair have crossed into Switzerland.

Cast

Production
According to Renoir's memoirs, Erich von Stroheim, despite having been born in Vienna, Austria (then the Austro-Hungarian Empire) did not speak much German and struggled with learning the language along with his lines in between filming scenes.

The exteriors of "Wintersborn" were filmed at the Upper Koenigsbourg Castle in Alsace. Other exteriors were filmed at the artillery barracks at Colmar (built by Wilhelm II) and at Neuf-Brisach on the Upper Rhine.

An early script version of La Grande Illusion had Rosenthal and Maréchal agreeing to meet in a restaurant at the end of the war. In the final scene, everyone there would be celebrating the armistice, but instead of these men, there would be two empty chairs at a table.

Political and historical themes
Renoir used the First World War (1914–1918) as a lens through which to examine Europe as it faced the rising spectre of fascism (especially in Nazi Germany) and the impending approach of the Second World War (1939–1945).<ref>Nixon, Rob and Felicia Feaster. [http://www.tcm.com/tcmdb/title/76799/Grand-Illusion/articles.html "Why 'Grand Illusion' is essential.] Turner Classic Movies. Retrieved: 20 March 2017.</ref> Renoir's critique of contemporary politics and ideology celebrates the universal humanity that transcends national and racial boundaries and radical nationalism, suggesting that mankind's common experiences should prevail above political division, and its extension: war.

On the message of La Grande Illusion, Renoir himself said, in a film trailer, dating from the re-release of the film in 1958: "[La Grande Illusion is] a story about human relationships. I am confident that such a question is so important today that if we don’t solve it, we will just have to say ‘goodbye’ to our beautiful world." Despite widespread interest in the subject, Renoir found it difficult to find a producer and distributor, having to "shop around" the project for years.

Class
La Grande Illusion examines the relationships between different social classes in Europe. Two of the main characters, Boëldieu and Rauffenstein, are aristocrats. They are represented as cosmopolitan men, educated in many cultures and conversant in several languages. Their level of education and their devotion to social conventions and rituals makes them feel closer to each other than to the lower class of their own nation. They share similar social experiences: dining at Maxim's in Paris, courting dalliances with the same woman, and even know of each other through acquaintances. They converse with each other in heavily formal French and German, and in moments of intimate personal conversation, escape into English as if to hide these comments from their lower class counterparts.

Renoir depicts the rule of the aristocracy in La Grande Illusion as in decline, to be replaced by a new, emerging social order, led by men who were not born to privilege. He emphasizes that their class is no longer an essential component to their respective nation's politics. Both Rauffenstein and Boëldieu view their military service as a duty, and see the war as having a purpose; as such, Renoir depicts them as laudable but tragic figures whose world is disappearing and who are trapped in a code of life that is rapidly becoming meaningless. Both are aware that their time is past, but their reaction to this reality diverges: Boëldieu accepts the fate of the aristocracy as a positive improvement, but Rauffenstein does not, lamenting what he sarcastically calls the "charming legacy of the French Revolution".

In La Grande Illusion, Renoir contrasts the aristocrats with characters such as Maréchal (Gabin), a mechanic from Paris. The lower class characters have little in common with each other; they have different interests and are not worldly in their views or education. Nonetheless, they have a kinship too, through common sentiment and experience.

Renoir's message is made clear when the aristocratic Boëldieu sacrifices himself by distracting the prison guards by dancing around, singing, and playing a flute, to allow Maréchal and Rosenthal, members of the lower class, to escape. Reluctantly and strictly out of duty, Rauffenstein is forced to shoot Boëldieu, an act that Boëldieu admits he would have been compelled to do were the circumstances reversed. However, in accepting his inevitable death, Boëldieu takes comfort in the idea that "For a commoner, dying in a war is a tragedy. But for you and me, it's a good way out", and states that he has pity for Rauffenstein who will struggle to find a purpose in the new social order of the world where his traditions, experiences, and background are obsolete.

The critique of the romantic idealization of duty in La Grande Illusion is comparable to that in the earlier film All Quiet on the Western Front (1930), based on the novel by Erich Maria Remarque.

Prejudice
In La Grande Illusion, Renoir briefly touches on the question of antisemitism through the character of Rosenthal, a son from a nouveau riche Jewish banking family (a parallel to the Rothschild banking family of France). His biographers believed that Renoir created this character to counter the rising anti-Jewish campaign enacted by Adolf Hitler's government in Nazi Germany. Further, Rosenthal is shown as a symbol of humanity across class lines: though he may be financially wealthy, he shares his food parcels with everyone so that he and his fellow prisoners are well fed — when compared with their German captors. Through the character of Rosenthal, Renoir rebuffs Jewish stereotypes.

There is also a black French officer among the prisoners at Wintersborn who appears to be ignored by the other prisoners, and not accepted as an equal by them. When he speaks to them he is not responded to. For instance, when he shows his artwork, he is shrugged off.

War
In La Grande Illusion Renoir seeks to refute the notion that war accomplishes anything, or that it can be used as a political tool to solve problems and create a better world. "That's all an illusion", says Rosenthal, speaking of the belief that this is the war that will end war forever.

La Grande Illusion is a war film without any depiction of battle. Instead, the prisoner of war camp setting is used as a space in which soldiers of many nations have a common experience. Renoir portrays war as a futile exercise. For instance, Elsa, the German widow, shows photos to Maréchal and Rosenthal of her husband and her brothers who were killed, respectively, at the battles of Verdun, Liège, Charleroi, and Tannenberg. The last three of these battles were amongst Germany's most celebrated victories in World War I. Through this device, Renoir refutes the notion that one common man's bravery, honor, or duty can make an impact on a great event. This undermines the idealistic intention of Maréchal and Rosenthal to return to the front, so that by returning to the fight they can help end this war.

Soundtrack
The score was written by the Hungarian composer Joseph Kosma, who also wrote the famous song "Autumn Leaves." The soundtrack also includes many well-known songs of the day from French, English, and German cultures. The uncredited musical director was the film and music critic Émile Vuillermoz, who had been a composer in his early career.

Songs:
 "Frou-Frou" (1897) lyrics written by Montréal and Blondeau, music by Henri Chatau, performed by Lucile Panis.
 "Il était un petit navire" ("There Once was a Little Ship"), played by Boëldieu with his penny whistle to distract the German guards from Rosenthal and Maréchal's escape, a traditional French song about a shipwrecked sailor who must cannibalize another sailor to survive. Later in the film, the fugitives Rosenthal and Maréchal shout the song sarcastically at one another as they have a near falling out. The lyrics speak to their own condition of running out of food. As Maréchal realizes this, his singing trails off.
 "Frère Jacques", a French nursery rhyme
 "It's a Long Way to Tipperary"
 "Si tu veux Marguerite" (1913) by Harry Fragson
 "La Marseillaise", the French national anthem

Reception

Europe
After the film won a prize at the Venice Film Festival for "Best Artistic Ensemble" in 1937, and was nominated for the International Jury Cup, the Nazi Propaganda Minister Joseph Goebbels declared La Grande Illusion "Cinematic Public Enemy No. 1" and ordered the prints to be confiscated and destroyed. Fearing a decline in fighting morale, French authorities banned the film in 1940 pour la durée des hostilités (for the duration of hostilities). This ban was renewed by the German Propaganda-Abteilung in October of the same year. When the German Army marched into France in 1940 during World War II, the Nazis seized the prints and negative of the film, chiefly because of its anti-war message, and what were perceived as ideological criticisms pointed towards Germany on the eve of the Second World War.

La Grande Illusion was a massive hit in France, with an estimated 12 million admissions.

United States and elsewhere
La Grande Illusion, released by World Pictures Corporation in the U.S. premiered on 12 September 1938 in New York City; Frank S. Nugent in his review for The New York Times called La Grande Illusion a "strange and interesting film" that "owes much to his cast", 

La Grande Illusion won the awards for Best Foreign Film at the 1938 New York Film Critics Circle Awards and at the 1938 National Board of Review Awards it was named the Best Foreign Language Film for that year. At the 11th Academy Awards held on 23 February 1939, La Grande Illusion became the first foreign language film nominated for the Academy Award for Best Picture.

Orson Welles, in an interview with Dick Cavett on 27 July 1970, expressed that if he only could save a handful of films that were not his own for future posterity, this would be one of those films.

Martin Scorsese included it on a list of "39 Essential Foreign Films for a Young Filmmaker."

Sixty years after its release, Janet Maslin called it "one of the most haunting of all war films" and an "oasis of subtlety, moral intelligence and deep emotion on the cinematic landscape"; according to Maslin:

Film critic Roger Ebert also reviewed the film after its 1999 re-release, and added it to his list of The Great Movies:

Filmmakers such as Akira Kurosawa and  Billy Wilder  cited La Grande Illusion as one of their favorite films.

Prints and home media
For many years, the original nitrate film negative of La Grande Illusion was thought to have been lost in an Allied air raid in 1942 that destroyed a leading laboratory outside Paris. Prints of the film were rediscovered in 1958 and restored and re-released during the early 1960s. Then, it was revealed that the original negative had been shipped back to Berlin (probably due to the efforts of Frank Hensel) to be stored in the Reichsfilmarchiv vaults. In the Allied occupation of Berlin in 1945, the Reichsfilmarchiv by chance was in the Russian zone and consequently shipped along with many other films back to be the basis of the Soviet Gosfilmofond film archive in Moscow. The negative was returned to France in the 1960s, but sat unidentified in storage in Toulouse Cinémathèque for over 30 years, as no one suspected it had survived. It was rediscovered in the early 1990s as the Cinémathèque's nitrate collection was slowly being transferred to the French Film Archives at Bois d'Arcy.

In August 1999, Rialto Pictures re-released the film in the United States, based on the Cinémathèque negative found in Toulouse; after watching the new print at Lincoln Plaza Cinemas, Janet Maslin called it "beautifully refurbished" and "especially lucid." A transfer of this restored print was released on DVD by the Criterion Collection in 1999, but has been out of print since 2005. Grand Illusion was intended to be Criterion's first release on the DVD format in 1998, but the discovery of the new negative delayed its release.

In 2012, StudioCanal and Lionsgate released a 1080p Blu-ray version based on a new high-definition scan of the original negative. According to Lee Kline, Technical Director of the Criterion Collection, this release was "night and day of what we didbecause they had better film."

See also
 Poetic realism

Notes

References

Further reading
 Cardullo, R. J. "Period Piece, Peace Picture: Renoir’s La Grande Illusion Reconsidered." in Teaching Sound Film (SensePublishers, Rotterdam, 2016) pp. 11–21. 
 Conroy, Melanie. "The Milieu of the Prisoner-of-War Camp in La Grande Illusion." Romance Notes 55.3 (2015): 371-384. excerpt
 
 
 Jackson, Julian. La grande illusion (Macmillan, 2009).
 Kerans, James. "Classics Revisited: 'La Grande Illusion'." Film Quarterly 14.2 (1960): 10-17. online
 Macdonald, Nicholas. In Search of La Grande Illusion: A Critical Appreciation of Jean Renoir's Elusive Masterpiece (McFarland, 2013).
 
 
 O'Reilly, Carmel. "À table: an exploration of the uses of food in Jean Renoir’s La Grande Illusion, 1937." Food and History 11.1 (2013): 155-175. online
 Samuels, Maurice. "Renoir's La Grande Illusion and the 'Jewish Question'." Historical Reflections/Réflexions Historiques 32.1 (2006): 165-192. online
 Sesonske, Alexander. "Jean Renoir's 'La Grande Illusion'." Georgia Review 29.1 (1975): 207-244. online
 Tallgren, Immi. "La Grande Illusion." Canadian Journal of Law & Jurisprudence 15.2 (2002): 297-316, on censorship online.

External links

Grand Illusion an essay by Peter Cowie at the Criterion Collection
Landmark: La Grande Illusion (2012) – Night Waves, BBC Radio 3

1937 films
1930s war drama films
French war drama films
1930s French-language films
French black-and-white films
World War I prisoner of war films
Anti-war films about World War I
Western Front (World War I) films
World War I aviation films
Films about shot-down aviators
Films set in Germany
Films shot in France
Films directed by Jean Renoir
French survival films
Censored films
1937 drama films
1930s survival films
Films scored by Joseph Kosma
1930s French films
Films shot in Alsace